The Boston Evening Traveller (1845–1967) was a newspaper published in Boston, Massachusetts. It was a daily newspaper, with weekly and semi-weekly editions under a variety of Traveller titles. It was absorbed by the Boston Herald in 1912, and ceased publication in 1967.

History

Founding
The Boston Evening Traveller was launched on April 1, 1845 by Reverend George Punchard and Deacon Ferdinand Andrews. The pair served as co-editors and used the paper to advocate for the temperance movement. In June 1845, Roland Worthington, a former member of the business department of the Boston Daily Advertiser, joined the paper as publisher.

Worthington years
During Worthington's tenure as publisher, the Evening Traveller became the first Boston paper to employ newspaper hawkers to sell papers in the streets rather than rely solely on subscriptions; and was the first paper in Boston to use headline posters to advertise papers. Compared to other papers in Boston in the 1840s, the Traveller was notable for its significantly lower retail price. The Evening Travellers first office was located at 47 Court Street. It later relocated to the Old State House before moving into its own building at 31 State Street. Under Worthington's leadership, the paper supported the views of the Free Soil Party and the later Republican Party. The paper's shift to the Republican Party led to the departure of Ferdinand Andrews, who supported Daniel Webster and the Cotton Whigs. Andrews was replaced as managing editor by twenty-two year old Manton Marble. In 1857, Samuel Bowles joined the paper. Marble and Bowles were unable to work together and Marble left for New York City. Bowles took over as managing editor on April 13, 1857 and soon thereafter merged the Evening Traveller with the Boston Atlas, the Boston Bee, and the Independent Chronicle. The merger was a failure and placed the paper in debt. Bowles left the Evening Traveler without notice on August 10, 1857 and returned to Springfield, Massachusetts. Bowles was succeeded by Joseph B. Morss. In 1859 Morss was succeeded by Reuben Crooke. As of 1878, one guide described the Evening Traveller as "the largest four-page evening paper in New England: five editions daily; the semi-weekly and weekly of each week contains sermons of Henry Ward Beecher; 'Review of the Week;' market and shipping reports; latest news and choice reading, prepared expressly for the family fireside." In 1879, reporter James W. Clarke became the paper's managing editor. He remained with the Evening Traveller until 1885, when he accepted the position of chief of editorial writers for The Boston Globe. From 1885 to 1891, W. F. Whitcher served as editor in chief. Whitcher was succeeded by Albert Edward Winship. Roland Worthington died on March 20, 1898 and the paper was sold in June 1891. The new owners replaced Winship as editor, bringing back Reuben Crooke.

Later years
In the 1900s, the paper was headquartered at 76 Summer Street (c. 1902–1912). In 1912 the Herald bought the Traveler and merged the papers into the Boston Traveler and Evening Herald, now published from the Herald'''s facility at 171 Tremont Street. From 1914 to 1918, future Territory of Alaska Governor and U.S. Senator Ernest Gruening served as the paper's managing editor. In 1928, the new owners moved the paper away from Republican politics by dropping the editorial page and replacing it with a "People's Forum". The morning Herald and the evening Traveler were published until 1967, when, due to declining circulation, they were combined into a morning newspaper known as the Herald-Traveler.

Variant titles
Dailies
 Daily Evening Traveller, 1845–1885
 Boston Evening Traveller, 1885–1889
 Boston Daily Traveller, c. 1856–1885, 1889–1894
 Boston Traveler, 1894–1912, 1914–1967
 Boston Traveler and Evening Herald, 1912–1914

Non-dailies
 American Traveller (semiweekly and weekly editions), c. 1845–1885
 American Semi-Weekly Traveller, 1851–1854
 Boston Traveller (semiweekly edition), c. 1855–1885
 American Weekly Traveller, c. 1851–1855

References

Images

External links

 Bostonian Society. Photos:
 State Street at the corner of Congress Street, ca. 1870
 Congress Street, 1872
 Traveller building, State Street, ca. 1874-1875
 Traveller building, ca. 1880-1894
 State and Congress Streets, ca. 1888-1894
 State Street, ca. 1890-1894
 Demolition of Traveller's Building, 1894
 Boston Public Library. Photos:
 Image of Old Traveller Building, after the alterations of the Rogers Building
 Photo of Herald Traveler building, 1930
 Photo of Herald Traveler building and vicinity, 1930
 Portrait of Austin Waldron, former Herald-Traveler cameraman, 1932
 Portrait of Tony Cabral, "famous Herald-Traveler cameraman," 1932
 Portrait of Abe Reed, Boston Herald-Traveler'' photographer, 1937
 MIT Libraries. Photo of Boston Herald Delivery Car on Newbury Street, Between Berkeley and Arlington Streets, 1950s

Newspapers published in Boston
19th century in Boston
20th century in Boston
Publications established in 1845
1967 disestablishments in Massachusetts
Defunct newspapers published in Massachusetts
1845 establishments in Massachusetts
Boston Herald